Enterprise, Ohio may refer to:

 Enterprise, Hocking County, Ohio, an unincorporated community
 Enterprise, Preble County, Ohio, an unincorporated community

See also
 Enterprise (disambiguation)